Granite Bay is a census-designated place (CDP) in Placer County, California, United States. It is part of the Sacramento–Arden-Arcade–Roseville Metropolitan Statistical Area. The population was 21,247 at the 2020 census, up from 20,402 at the 2010 census.  The ZIP codes are 95746 and 95661. Granite Bay is a primarily residential  suburb of Sacramento and is located just east of Roseville and west of Folsom Lake.

Geography 

Granite Bay is located at  (38.748504, -121.179793).
The place name, Granite Bay, is derived from a bay in Folsom Lake, a reservoir on the east side of the town created in 1955.  
The entire town is underlain by granodiorite of the Penryn Pluton of Cretaceous age, hence the geological basis for the place name.

Climate
Granite Bay has a hot-summer Mediterranean climate (Köppen climate classification Csa) that is characterized by cool, wet winters and hot, dry summers (Köppen climate classification Csa).

Cultural Resources
The history of Granite Bay started with the Maidu Indians, and it continued when miners, farmers, and others seeking to do business came during the Gold Rush to strike a fortune. The Granite Bay area was officially recognized on July 28, 1987 by the Board of Supervisors. 

The Nisenan, also known as the Southern Maidu, were one of three Maiduan-speaking tribes in the northern half of the Sacramento Valley. The Granite Bay area is located in the ethnographic territory of the Nisenan. The Nisenan lived along the American, Yuba, and Bear Rivers, as well as the Feather River, to which their territory extended.

Demographics

2010
At the 2010 census Granite Bay had a population of 20,402. The racial makeup of Granite Bay was 17,960 (88.0%) White, 148 (0.7%) African American, 138 (0.7%) Native American, 1,152 (5.6%) Asian, 28 (0.1%) Pacific Islander, 222 (1.1%) from other races, and 754 (3.7%) from two or more races. Hispanic or Latino of any race were 1,260 persons (6.2%).

The census reported that 20,353 people (99.8% of the population) lived in households, 38 (0.2%) lived in non-institutionalized group quarters, and 11 (0.1%) were institutionalized.

There were 7,202 households, 2,857 (39.7%) had children under the age of 18 living in them, 5,223 (72.5%) were opposite-sex married couples living together, 473 (6.6%) had a female householder with no husband present, 260 (3.6%) had a male householder with no wife present.  There were 201 (2.8%) unmarried opposite-sex partnerships, and 34 (0.5%) same-sex married couples or partnerships. 1,006 households (14.0%) were one person and 521 (7.2%) had someone living alone who was 65 or older. The average household size was 2.83.  There were 5,956 families (82.7% of households); the average family size was 3.11.

The age distribution was 5,309 people (26.0%) under the age of 18, 1,300 people (6.4%) aged 18 to 24, 3,206 people (15.7%) aged 25 to 44, 7,621 people (37.4%) aged 45 to 64, and 2,966 people (14.5%) who were 65 or older.  The median age was 46.0 years. For every 100 females, there were 98.5 males.  For every 100 females age 18 and over, there were 96.2 males.

There were 7,542 housing units at an average density of 349.6 per square mile, of the occupied units 6,414 (89.1%) were owner-occupied and 788 (10.9%) were rented. The homeowner vacancy rate was 1.3%; the rental vacancy rate was 8.8%.  18,270 people (89.6% of the population) lived in owner-occupied housing units and 2,083 people (10.2%) lived in rental housing units.

2000
At the 2000 census there were 19,388 people, 6,474 households, and 5,587 families in the CDP. The racial makeup of the CDP was 91.40% White, 0.68% Black or African American, 0.58% Native American, 3.53% Asian, 0.08% Pacific Islander, 1.09% from other races, and 2.65% from two or more races.  4.69% of the population were Hispanic or Latino of any race.
Of the 6,474 households 45.1% had children under the age of 18 living with them, 77.0% were married couples living together, 6.3% had a female householder with no husband present, and 13.7% were non-families. 10.6% of households were one person and 3.5% were one person aged 65 or older.  The average household size was 3.09 and the average family size was 2.91 The age distribution was 30.8% under the age of 18, 4.7% from 18 to 24, 24.8% from 25 to 44, 30.6% from 45 to 64, and 9.2% 65 or older.  The median age was 40 years. For every 100 females, there were 100.2 males.  For every 100 females age 18 and over, there were 96.7 males.

According to a 2007 estimate, the median household income was $115,980, and the median family income  was $119,874. Males had a median income of $100,000+ versus $73,190 for females. The per capita income for the CDP was $57,970.  About 1.5% of families and 2.1% of the population were below the poverty line, including 1.9% of those under age 18 and 2.3% of those age 65 or over.  Granite Bay is named top 25 American cities in the nation for highest  cost of living.

According to the Sacramento Association of REALTORS, the median price of a detached single family home is $715,000 as of April 2009.

Famous current and former residents
 Shareef Abdur-Rahim - Assistant general manager, Sacramento Kings and retired National Basketball Association (NBA) player
 Rick Adelman - Minnesota Timberwolves head coach, former Sacramento Kings head coach
 Danny Ainge - Former NBA basketball player and current President of Basketball Operations for the Boston Celtics
 Dusty Baker - Houston Astros manager, former Washington Nationals, San Francisco Giants, Chicago Cubs, and Cincinnati Reds manager; retired Major League Baseball player primarily with the Atlanta Braves and the Los Angeles Dodgers
 Lincoln Brewster - contemporary Christian music artist who is also the senior worship pastor at Bayside Church.
 Steve Cook - Former professional ten-pin bowler and member of the PBA Hall of Fame
 DeMarcus Cousins - Professional NBA player for the Denver Nuggets
 Bobby Jackson - Retired NBA player and current assistant coach for the Sacramento Kings
 Eddie Jordan - Philadelphia 76ers head coach, former Sacramento Kings, Washington Wizards, Rutgers Scarlet Knights head coach
 Jeff Keith - Singer of band Tesla
 Leron Lee - Retired Major League Baseball player for the St. Louis Cardinals, Los Angeles Dodgers, Cleveland Indians and San Diego Padres
 Eddie Murphy - actor
 Geoff Petrie - Sacramento Kings President of Basketball Operations and former NBA player with the Portland Trail Blazers
 Maureen Reagan - Daughter of former President Ronald Reagan, lived here until her death
 Summer Sanders - Multiple gold medalist in swimming at the 1992 Summer Olympics,  TV Sports commentator and personality
 Dallas Sartz - NFL linebacker
 Steve Sax - Retired MLB baseball player (primarily second baseman for the Los Angeles Dodgers, New York Yankees, Chicago White Sox, and Oakland Athletics)
William "Rick" Singer, ringleader of the 2019 college admissions bribery scandal.
 Predrag Stojaković - New Orleans Hornets, former Sacramento Kings small forward
 Tommy Thompson - American soccer player who currently plays for the San Jose Earthquakes in Major League Soccer.
 Maria Viktorovna - ASMR practitioner and content creator known under the pseudonym “Gentle Whispering.”
 Chris Webber - Retired Sacramento Kings power forward and center
 Jason Williams - Orlando Magic, former Sacramento Kings point guard

Education
Granite Bay is served by two high school districts and their feeder K-8 districts: The Loomis Union School District and Placer Union High School District for the northern portion of the community, and the Eureka Union School District and Roseville Joint Union High School District for the southern portion. The two high schools serving Granite Bay are RJUHSD's Granite Bay High School and PUHSD's Del Oro High School in nearby Loomis. The Eureka Union School District is also one of the state's highest performing districts according to Standardized Testing and Reporting. This is one of the few California school districts with its own parent sponsored educational foundations.

References

External links

Eureka Union SD website
Roseville Joint Union SD website 
Eureka Schools Foundation website
Granite Bay Community Association

Census-designated places in Placer County, California
Census-designated places in California